The 67th Filmfare Awards ceremony, presented by The Times Group, honored the best Indian Hindi-language films of 2021.

Shershaah led the ceremony with 19 nominations, followed by Sardar Udham and 83 with 14 each, Rashmi Rocket with 11 and Sandeep Aur Pinky Faraar with 10 nominations.

Sardar Udham won nine awards, including Best Film (Critics) and Best Actor (Critics) (for Vicky Kaushal), thus becoming the most-awarded film at the ceremony. 

Shershaah and Mimi won multiple awards at the ceremony, with the former winning Best Film and Best Director (for Vishnuvardhan), and the latter winning Best Actress (for Kriti Sanon), Best Supporting Actor (for Pankaj Tripathi) and Best Supporting Actress (for Sai Tamhankar).

For a second consecutive year, Pankaj Tripathi received dual nominations for Best Supporting Actor for his performances in 83 and Mimi, winning the award for the latter.

Ceremony
Held at Jio World Centre, the 67th Filmfare Awards honored the films released in 2021. At a press conference helmed by editor of Filmfare magazine, Jitesh Pillai revealed Wolf777news as the title sponsor. Actors Ranveer Singh and Arjun Kapoor were announced as the co-hosts, while actors Nora Fatehi, Vicky Kaushal, Kartik Aaryan, Disha Patani, Janhvi Kapoor, Varun Dhawan and Kiara Advani were announced to be performing during the event. It took place on August 30, 2022, and will be broadcast on September 9, 2022 on Colors TV.

Winners and nominees
The nominations were announced by Filmfare on 18 August 2022 and the winners were announced on 30 August 2022.

Popular awards

Critics' awards

Special awards

Technical awards
Nominations for the Technical awards were announced on 30 July 2022.

Short film awards

Controversy
Actress Kangana Ranaut shared a message through her Instagram story stating that the Filmfare Awards were corrupt and accused them of handing out the awards just for attending the ceremony, and thus decided to sue them. Initially, she was nominated for Best Actress for her performance in the film Thalaivii, but post her allegations, Filmfare withdrew her nomination and rejected her allegations in their Instagram story.

Superlatives

See also
Filmfare Awards
List of Hindi films of 2021

References

Filmfare Awards
2022 Indian film awards